George Thomas Maris (born 6 March 1996) is an English professional footballer who plays as a central midfielder for League Two club Mansfield Town.

Career
Maris began his career at Barnsley at under-15 level, signing his first professional contract on 29 May 2014 after a 20-goal season for the under-18s.

On 30 January 2015, he went on a one-month youth loan to Nuneaton Town in the Conference Premier. He started on his senior debut the following day, in a 1–0 loss at Forest Green Rovers. On 28 February, he played in their 1–0 win over Welling United two days after his loan had expired; this resulted in Nuneaton receiving a three-point deduction. He played nine matches in total, without scoring, in a season which ended with relegation.

Maris was first included in a Barnsley matchday squad on 25 April 2015, for their League One fixture against fellow Yorkshiremen Bradford City at Valley Parade; he replaced Luke Berry for the final 13 minutes of a 1–0 loss. Eight days later he made his first professional start at Oakwell, as his team concluded their season with a 5–0 rout of Rochdale.

On 1 February 2016, Maris was signed on loan for the rest of the season by Lincoln City.

On 3 June 2016 Maris signed a one-year deal with League Two club Cambridge United. He made his debut for the club against Barnet F.C on 6 August 2016, a 1–1 draw at the Abbey Stadium. Maris scored his first goal for the club away at Wycombe Wanderers in a 2–1 loss 19 November 2016. He later signed a contract extension for a further two years in April 2017.

He was offered a new contract by Cambridge United at the end of the 2018–19 season.

On 28 July 2020, Maris signed a two-year contract with League Two side Mansfield Town after joining the club for an undisclosed fee.

Career statistics

References

External links

1996 births
Living people
English footballers
Association football forwards
Barnsley F.C. players
Cambridge United F.C. players
Lincoln City F.C. players
Nuneaton Borough F.C. players
Guiseley A.F.C. players
Mansfield Town F.C. players
National League (English football) players
English Football League players